George Balfour (1872 – 26 September 1941) was a British Conservative Party politician and engineer. He was of Scottish parentage where he also spent part of his upbringing but was born in Portsmouth, England. He served his long parliamentary career representing a constituency in the County of London and lived much of his life in England.

Career
George Balfour joined the Blackness Foundry in Dundee as an apprentice in 1888. He subsequently qualified as a mechanical and electrical engineer. In 1909, together with Andrew Beatty, an English accountant, he founded Balfour Beatty which was to become an international construction business. Under his leadership the company installed a new tramway system in Dunfermline in Fife. The two partners also founded Power Securities, a business established to pursue opportunities in hydro-electric power, in 1922. He was vice-chairman in 1929 and chairman in 1938 of the Lancashire Electric Power Company.

Political life
From 1918 to 1941, Balfour sat as Member of Parliament (MP) for Hampstead. He contributed to many debates on employment issues.

Death
Balfour died on 26 September 1941 at which time he was still a serving MP.

Honours
In 2020 he was inducted into the Scottish Engineering Hall of Fame.

References

1872 births
1941 deaths
Conservative Party (UK) MPs for English constituencies
UK MPs 1918–1922
UK MPs 1922–1923
UK MPs 1923–1924
UK MPs 1924–1929
UK MPs 1929–1931
UK MPs 1931–1935
UK MPs 1935–1945
Scottish mechanical engineers
Anglo-Scots
Scottish businesspeople